Dauda Lawal (born 2 September 1965), is a Nigerian banker, who is known to be an established leader in the Nigerian Banking Industry. Lawal was known to be one of the key players in the financial sector of the Nigerian Economy  as he served as the executive director, Public Sector North, of First Bank of Nigeria Plc]he is the aspirant of  governor of zamfara state under people Democratic Party (PDP) 2023

Early life 
Dauda Lawal, an ethnic Muslim Hausa from Zamfara State, Dauda was born on 2 September 1965 into a humble family popularly known in the textile industry in Gusau, Zamfara State.

Education 
Lawal graduated from Ahmadu Bello University in 1987 with B.Sc. in political science. he obtained an M.Sc. in political science/international relations from the same university in 1992, and holds a PhD in business administration from Usmanu Danfodiyo University, Sokoto, before going further to develop himself by taking courses at prestigious universities, including the London School of Economics, Harvard Business School, Oxford University Business School and Lagos Business School among others.

Professional career 
He started his working career in 1989 as a political education officer with the Agency for Mass Mobilization for Social and Economic Reliance Nigeria. In 1989, he joined Westex Nigeria Limited as an assistant general manager.  
In 1994 he was appointed as an assistant consular officer (immigration), and later chief protocol officer, Embassy of Nigeria, Washington, D.C., US. Dauda Lawal joined First Bank of Nigeria Plc in May 2003; as relationship manager, commercial banking, and was at various times senior manager, Abuja Area office, business development manager, Abuja, principal manager, group head PSG II, assistant general manager (business development manager), Maitama, deputy general manager (business development manager), Maitama/group head public sector, Abuja. Between October 2010 and September 2011, Lawal was elevated to the position of executive vice president, public sector, North of First Bank of Nigeria Plc. In September 2012 he became executive director, Public Sector North, of First Bank of Nigeria Plc.

Dauda Lawal ran for office in 2019 for governor of Zamfara state under the flagship .

Dauda Lawal's Political Career  
Dauda Lawal said that he joined the 2023 governorship race of Zamfara State to rescue the state from the challenges bedeviling it.

Dauda Lawal is the governorship candidate of the Peoples Democratic Party (PDP) in the 2023 general elections.

Awards 
FirstBank CEO Merit Award for Outstanding Performance as the "Best Business Development Manager" in 2006 and "The Most Enterprising Staff" in 2009.

References

Further reading
 Those Who Inspire Ltd (2015) Those Who Inspire Nigeria, Emirates Printing Press 

1965 births
Living people
Nigerian bankers